DeCoursey is both a surname and a given name. Notable people with the name include:

Surname:
James H. DeCoursey Jr. (1932-2016), American politician
Jillian DeCoursey (born 1984), American mixed martial artist
Patricia DeCoursey (1932–2022), American biologist
Pete DeCoursey (1961–2014), American journalist

Given name:
DeCoursey Fales (1888–1966), American bibliophile